Mount Michael Rural LLG is a local-level government (LLG) of Eastern Highlands Province, Papua New Guinea.

Wards
01. Agotu
02. Hegeturu
03. Fiamotave
04. Megino No. 1
05. Gouno
06. Beha
07. Korowa
08. Lufa Station
09. Hairo
10. Menilo
11. Hagaulo
12. Kuruku

References

Local-level governments of Eastern Highlands Province